Apagodiplosis is a genus of gall midges in the family Cecidomyiidae. There is one described species in Apagodiplosis, A. papyriferae.

References

Further reading

 
 
 
 
 

Cecidomyiinae
Articles created by Qbugbot
Cecidomyiidae genera